Hasan Saka (1885 – 29 July 1960) was a Turkish politician, minister of foreign affairs, and prime minister of Turkey.

Political career

He graduated from "Mülkiye Mektebi" (School of Civil Service) in 1908. Hasan Saka started working for government in "Divan-ı Muhasebat" (Council of Accounts). He was sent to France for further education by the Ottoman government in 1909. After graduating from the School of Political Science with a diplomacy major, he returned home to continue his prior job.

He was elected as a member of the Ottoman Parliament in Istanbul at its last term and kept his position until the parliament was closed. He was elected as a member of Grand National Assembly of Turkey from Trabzon at its first term on 28 January 1921. He was a member of the Turkish delegation at the Lausanne Conference. 

Saka was appointed as minister of foreign affairs on 13 September 1944. He quit this position on 9 September 1947 when the entire cabinet resigned.

He was appointed as prime minister on 10 September 1947. He formed his second cabinet on 10 June 1948. He resigned from office on 9 September 1949 but continued to be a member of parliament. His political life ended in 1954 when he decided not to run for the parliament again.

He died on 29 July 1960 in Istanbul, and was laid to rest at the Zincirlikuyu Cemetery.

References

Ministry of Defence of Republic of Turkey

External links

1885 births
1960 deaths
20th-century prime ministers of Turkey
People from Trabzon
Ministers of Foreign Affairs of Turkey
Prime Ministers of Turkey
Burials at Zincirlikuyu Cemetery
Ministers of National Defence of Turkey
Republican People's Party (Turkey) politicians
Ministers of Finance of Turkey
Deputies of Trabzon
Members of the 1st government of Turkey
Members of the 2nd government of Turkey
Members of the 4th government of Turkey
Members of the 15th government of Turkey
Members of the 16th government of Turkey
Members of the 17th government of Turkey
Mekteb-i Mülkiye alumni
Members of the 2nd Parliament of Turkey